The Burkinabé SuperCup, known in English as the Burkina Faso Super Cup, is a match competition in Burkinabé football, played between the Burkinabé Premier League champions and the Coupe du Faso winners.

The cup is known as the Coupe de l'Association Sportive des Journalistes du Burkina.

Winners

Past finals

Performances by club

References

External links 
Burkina Faso - List of Super Cup Winners, RSSSF.com

SuperCup
Burkina Faso